Todd Philcox (born September 25, 1966 in Norwalk, Connecticut) is a former NFL quarterback.

Career

Philcox came out of Syracuse University and then played nine years in the NFL for the Cincinnati Bengals, Cleveland Browns, Tampa Bay Buccaneers, Jacksonville Jaguars, San Diego Chargers, and New England Patriots. In 1993 Philcox was starting for the Cleveland Browns in week 11 against Seattle. On the first play of the game Philcox fumbled the ball; it was recovered by Seattle and was run in for a Seahawks touchdown.  It was the fastest score in franchise history for Seattle. Philcox finished 4 for 8 and passed for 49 yards and had one interception in 1991. Philcox would go on to play two more seasons for Clevelend.  He never fully recovered from a broken thumb in September 1992.

References

External links
 

1966 births
Living people
American football quarterbacks
Syracuse Orange football players
Cincinnati Bengals players
Cleveland Browns players
Tampa Bay Buccaneers players
Jacksonville Jaguars players
San Diego Chargers players
New England Patriots players
Norwalk High School (Connecticut) alumni